When the Sky Falls is a 2000 film à clef directed by John Mackenzie and starring Joan Allen. The narrative centres on reporter Veronica Guerin, who wrote about drug-related crime for the Sunday Independent, and her eventual murder.

Cast
 Joan Allen as Sinead Hamilton
 Patrick Bergin as Mackey
 Pete Postlethwaite as Martin Shaughnessy
 Liam Cunningham as John Cosgrove
 Karl Argue as Smokey/Teenager
 Jimmy Smallhorne as Mickey O'Fagan
 Kevin McNally as Tom Hamilton
 Gerard Mannix Flynn as Dave Hackett
 Danny O'Carroll as Shaughnessy's son

Production
When the Sky Falls was filmed in Ireland.

See also
 Veronica Guerin, the 2003 film covering the same story.

References

External links 
 
 

2000 films
2000s crime drama films
2000 biographical drama films
Irish crime drama films
Irish biographical drama films
British crime drama films
British biographical drama films
American crime drama films
American biographical drama films
Biographical films about journalists
Films directed by John Mackenzie (film director)
Films about organised crime in Ireland
Films shot in Ireland
Films à clef
2000s English-language films
2000s American films
2000s British films